Zenker's honeyguide (Melignomon zenkeri) is a species of bird in the family Indicatoridae. It is found in Cameroon, Central African Republic, Republic of the Congo, Democratic Republic of the Congo, Equatorial Guinea, Gabon, and Uganda.

The common name and Latin binomial commemorate the German botanist Georg Zenker.

References

Zenker's honeyguide
Birds of Central Africa
Zenker's honeyguide
Taxonomy articles created by Polbot